Porker may refer to:

 Pig, particularly those fattened for eating
 An obese person
 Porsche motor cars, sometimes known as Porkers
 A lie, known by the slang term porkie pie or porker